This is a list of renamed places in Zambia. After independence, a number of cities and towns were renamed.

Country 
The country now known as Zambia was known as Northern Rhodesia from 1911. It was renamed Zambia at independence in 1964. The new name was derived from the Zambezi river.

Cities and towns 
 Fife → Nakonde pre-independence
 Balovale → Zambezi
Bancroft → Chililabombwe (1967)
 Fort Jameson → Chipata (1967)
 Broken Hill → Kabwe (1967)
 Feira → Luangwa (1964)
 Fort Rosebery → Mansa (1967)
 Abercorn → Mbala (1967)

Proposed 
The following name changes have been proposed but not actually implemented:
 Livingstone → Mosi-O-Tunya

Airports 
 Copperbelt International Airport → Simon Mwansa Kapwepwe International Airport (2021)
 Livingstone International Airport → Harry Mwanga Nkumbula International Airport (2011)
 Lusaka International Airport → Kenneth Kaunda International Airport (2011)
 Ndola International Airport → Simon Mwansa Kapwepwe International Airport (2011) → Peter Zuze Air Force Base (2021)

Streets 
 Cecil Avenue (in Lusaka) → Independence Avenue (1964)

See also 
 Lists of renamed places

References 

Geography of Zambia
History of Zambia
Zambia
Lists of place names
Zambia geography-related lists
Zambia
Zambia